is a Japanese women's professional shogi player ranked 1-dan.

Promotion history
Watanabe's promotion history is as follows:

 2-kyū: April 1, 2009
 1-kyū: March 3, 2011
 1-dan: August 2, 2013

Note: All ranks are women's professional ranks.

References

External links
 ShogiHub: Watanabe, Mio

1979 births
Living people
Japanese shogi players
Women's professional shogi players
Professional shogi players from Niigata Prefecture
University of Tokyo alumni